The financial system of Bangladesh consists of three broad sectors. They are
 Formal sector
 Semi-formal sector
 Informal sector

The sectors have been categorized in accordance with their degree of regulation.
The formal sector includes all regulated institutions like banks, non-bank financial institutions (FIs), insurance companies, capital market Intermediaries like brokerage houses, merchant banks etc.; micro finance institutions (MFIs).

The semi formal sector includes those institutions which are regulated otherwise but do not fall under the jurisdiction of Central Bank, Insurance Authority, Securities and Exchange Commission or any other enacted financial regulator. This sector is mainly represented by Specialized Financial Institutions like House Building Finance Corporation (HBFC), Palli Karma Sahayak Foundation (PKSF), Samabay Bank, Grameen Bank etc., Non-governmental organizations (NGOs) and discrete government programs.

The informal sector includes private intermediaries which are completely unregulated.

Formal sector
The formal sector of the financial system of Bangladesh comprises two sub-sectors which are,
Financial Market
Regulators & Institutions

Financial market
There are three types of financial markets in Bangladesh. They are: 
Money Market : Banks, Non-bank Financial Institutions, and Primary Dealers
Capital Market : Investment Banks, Credit Rating Companies, and Stock Exchanges
Foreign Exchange Market : Authorized Dealers.

Regulators and institutions
Bangladesh bank(Central Bank of Bangladesh):
 regulate 61 scheduled & 5 non-scheduled banks, 34 Non-Banking Financial Institutions (NBFIs)

Bangladesh securities and exchange commission:
 Stock Exchanges, Stock Dealers & Brokers, Merchants Banks, Asset Management Company (AMCs), Credit Rating Agencies etc.

Insurance Development & Regulatory Authority(IDRA)
 18 Life and 44 Non-Life Insurance Companies
Microcredit Regulatory Authority(MRA)
 599 Micro Finance Institutions (MFIs)

Semi-formal sector
The semi formal sector comprises some Specialized Financial Institutions:
House Building Financial Corporation(HBFC)
Palli Karma Sahayak Foundation(PKSF).https://www.pksf-bd.org/portal/ 
Samabay Bank
Grameen Bank

Informal sector
The informal sector includes private intermediaries which are completely unregulated.

References